Sir Charles Fergusson, 7th Baronet,  (17 January 1865 – 20 February 1951), was a British Army officer and the third Governor-General of New Zealand.

Early life and military career
Fergusson was the son of Sir James Fergusson, 6th Baronet, the 6th Governor of New Zealand. He was educated at Eton College and the Royal Military College, Sandhurst, before joining the Grenadier Guards in 1883. He served in Sudan from 1896 to 1898, becoming Commanding Officer of the 15th Sudanese Regiment in 1899 and Commander of the Omdurman District in 1900. He was made Adjutant General of the Egyptian Army in early 1901 and Commanding Officer of 3rd Battalion Grenadier Guards in 1904 before becoming a Brigadier-General on the staff of the Irish Command in 1907. 

He was appointed Inspector of Infantry in 1909 and General Officer Commanding 5th Division in Ireland in 1913 – in this capacity he played a key role during the Curragh incident, ensuring his officers obeyed orders. He took the 5th Division to France in August 1914 at the start of the First World War, and then briefly took command of the 9th (Scottish) Division from October to December 1914. 

He commanded II Corps from January 1915 and then, from May 1916, XVII Corps, which he led until the end of the war.

After the war Fergusson was a Military Governor of Cologne before he retired in 1922.

Governor-General of New Zealand
A year after an unsuccessful attempt to enter parliament through the South Ayrshire constituency in the 1923 general election, Fergusson was appointed Governor-General of New Zealand and served until 1930. His father, Sir James Fergusson, had served as a Governor of New Zealand, and his son Lord Ballantrae was the tenth and last British-appointed governor-general.

On 20 June 1929 Fergusson was involved in a railway accident, following the 1929 Murchison earthquake. Attached to the rear of a train leaving the National Dairy Show at Palmerston North with 200 passengers on board, the Viceregal carriage contained the Governor-General and his wife and other members of the Viceregal party. The train hit a slip between Paekakariki and Pukerua Bay, with the locomotive falling down a steep bank and injuring the driver. The first three carriages of the train also left the rails, but the Viceregal carriage remained on the tracks, and Fergusson and his party suffered only minor cuts and bruises.

Marriage and family
Fergusson married Lady Alice Mary Boyle on 18 July 1901. She was a daughter of David Boyle, 7th Earl of Glasgow. They had five children:

 Helen Dorothea Fergusson (born 15 October 1902) married 1925 Major Leonard Proby Haviland
 Sir James Fergusson, 8th Baronet (born 18 September 1904, died 25 October 1973)
 The Reverend Simon Charles David Fergusson (born 5 June 1907, died 1982). He married Auriole Kathleen Hughes-Onslow, maternal granddaughter of Arthur Crofton, 4th Baron Crofton. They had two sons and two daughters, one of whom was Scottish MP Alex Fergusson.
 Brigadier Bernard Edward Fergusson, Baron Ballantrae (born 6 May 1911, died 28 November 1980)
 Charles Fergusson (born 16 January 1917, died 22 January 1917)

Freemasonry
Fergusson was a Freemason. During his term as governor-general, he was also Grand Master of the Grand Lodge of New Zealand.

Later life
After his term in New Zealand, Fergusson became chairman of the West Indies Closer Union Commission and was Lord Lieutenant of Ayrshire from 1937 until his death on 20 February 1951.

Arms

References

External links

 Official biography

|-

|-

|-
 

|-

1865 births
1951 deaths
Graduates of the Royal Military College, Sandhurst
British Army generals of World War I
British Army personnel of the Mahdist War
Charles
7
Governors-General of New Zealand
Knights Grand Cross of the Order of St Michael and St George
Knights Grand Cross of the Order of the Bath
Members of the Royal Victorian Order
Companions of the Distinguished Service Order
Lord-Lieutenants of Ayrshire
New Zealand people of Scottish descent
New Zealand Freemasons
Grenadier Guards officers
British Army generals